Prevole is a village in the Municipality of Žužemberk in southeastern Slovenia. The area is part of the historical region of Lower Carniola. The municipality is now included in the Southeast Slovenia Statistical Region.

Church

The local church is dedicated to the Holy Cross and belongs to the Parish of Hinje. It has a 13th-century Romanesque nave and was extended in the 17th century.

References

External links
Prevole at Geopedia

Populated places in the Municipality of Žužemberk